Leonard Burnett (April 5, 1845 in Yorkshire, England - August 21, 1932) was a politician, farmer and teacher. He was elected to the House of Commons of Canada in the 1896 election as a Member of the Liberal Party in the 1896 election to represent the riding of Ontario South.

The son of Thomas Burnett and Hannah Dickenson, he came to Canada in 1846, was educated in Greenwood, Ontario and Whitby and settled in Greenbank. Burnett taught school for three years.

Prior to his federal political experience, he was councillor for Ontario County (1871-1873) then Deputy Reeve for Reach Township, Ontario (1891) then reeve (1892-1893).

In 1870, he married Sarah Jane Dryden. Burnett died in Toronto at the age of 87.

References

1845 births
1932 deaths
English emigrants to Canada
Liberal Party of Canada MPs
Members of the House of Commons of Canada from Ontario
Place of birth missing